Ahn Bo-hyun (Korean: 안보현; born May 16, 1988) is a South Korean actor, model and television personality under FN Entertainment. As a graduate from Busan Sports High School, he used to participate in amateur boxing competitions and previously won a gold medal. Since his acting debut in 2014, he has appeared in various films and television dramas. Ahn achieved success and made a turning point within his acting career through Itaewon Class (2020). He won the Excellence Award, Actor in an OTT Drama for his roles in Yumi's Cells and My Name at the 8th APAN Star Awards (September 29, 2022).

Early life and career 
Ahn was born in Busan, South Korea on May 16, 1988. As a graduate from Busan Sports High School, he used to participate in amateur boxing competitions and previously won a gold medal.

He originally debuted as a model in 2007. Since his acting debut in 2014, he has appeared in various films and television dramas including, Descendants of the Sun (2016), Dokgo Rewind (2018), Her Private Life (2019). Ahn achieved success and achieved a breakthrough through Itaewon Class (2020), in which he portrayed the villainous character Jang Geun-won. He continued his success with his subsequent male lead roles in Netflix series My Name (2021), tvN dramas Yumi's Cells (2021–2022) and Military Prosecutor Doberman (2022).

Philanthropy 
On May 28, 2022, Ahn donated 528 boxes of sanitary napkins to the underprivileged on the occasion of World Menstruation Day, by donating through the G-Foundation Foundation.

Filmography

Film

Television series

Web series

Television shows

Web shows

Hosting

Ambassadorship 
 Honorary Marine Police Officer (2021)

Awards and nominations

Listicles

Notes

References

External links 

 Ahn Bo-hyun at FN Entertainment
 
 
 

1988 births
Living people
South Korean male television actors
South Korean male film actors